Parliamentary elections were held in Brazil on 15 November 1978. The pro-government National Renewal Alliance Party (ARENA) won 231 of the 420 seats in the Chamber of Deputies and 15 of the 23 seats in the Senate. Voter turnout was 81.7%.

They were the last elections held under a mandatory two-party system, as reforms were enacted in 1979 by Brazil's governing military junta, represented in Congress by ARENA, to allow a multi-party system to emerge in an effort to combat the growing popularity of the opposition Brazilian Democratic Movement (MDB) by splitting their vote.

Electoral system
In 1977 the electoral system had been reformed, making the election of senators indirect. As with the 1979 reforms, this was primarily done in response to the growth of the Brazilian Democratic Movement. The Senate election saw the MDB win only eight of the 23 seats, despite receiving 57% of the vote.

Results

Chamber of Deputies

Senate

References

General elections in Brazil
Brazil
Legislative
Brazil